Edathanattukara or Kottappalla is a town in Palakkad District, Kerala, India.

Geography

Edathanattukara is situated in Alanallur panchayat, Mannarkkad Taluk. The river Velliyar flows through the southeastern boundary of Edathanattukara.

Etymology
There are differences of opinion about the origin of the village's name. The Edathanattukara is derived from the word . The ancient people had witnessed that it got the name because it is situated in between northern mountain and river Velliyar. It is said that there were gooseberry hills in the place. So it has also an old name Nellikkurssi. In the middle of Edathanattukara, we can see a kunnu known as Kodiyam kunnu. It is also not connected with the old name Nellikkurssi. According to the ancient people there were a large number of "Odiyan" in Odiyankunnu (Kodiyam kunnu). So the old name Nellikkurssi is not relevant.

History
Edathanattukara was a strong Hindu-oriented society, Kshathriya families ruled entire Edathanattukara peacefully with Chathurvarnya system. Later some families shifted because of the continuous attacks of Muslim people in ad 1921, to ottappalam on the other bank of Bharathappuzha and made their own social set up there. Put the name Nellikkurissi as their new village. now also village has families named Nellikkurissi as their family clan name is living in the village. C. N. Ahmad Moulavi lived in Edathanattukara and he contributed many ideas to spread Islamist development of Edathanattukara to today's culture. The name of Edathanattukara reveals that a long history existed here, that is "Kottamala" and "Kottappalla" are pointed to fort (Kotta). During a recent excavation for a house foundation, there a hall was discovered large enough to house 25 persons at a time. Nearby a room was also discovered. More ever many potteries had also seen there. At the surroundings of Nalukandam School we can see many square wells. According to ancient people, it was once a market place. In this market the people can get fresh Spinach from "Kongunadu", a place belongs to Tamil Nadu. In Edathanattukara, we can see a place "Kodiyamkunnu". It was connected with "Odiyans". The "pulayas" and "Panas" were changed their figures as animals. They disturbed many people who had enemy with them. So the name Kodiyamkunnu is derived from the old name "Odiyankunnu".

Edathanattukara was a Valluvanadan Taluk of Malabar District, which was under the Malabar presidency. Before British rule villages were known as "Amsams". Before 1896 this place was under "Arakkaparambu" Amsam. 
The major portion of western Edathanattukara was under the "Aazhirazhi" (Aayiram Nazhi) kovilakam of Melattur. The Zamindars of this area had given "Karam" to Elamkulam mana. Rice was decided as "karam". After many years the plots of this area were undertaken by many people.

Economy

An agriculture village, Edathanattukara is very famous. There were no bare land in this area. Paddy is the main crop of this village. The fame and prestige of the landlords of Edathanattukara is considered by the quantity of paddy and heap of hay. Although pepper, ginger, turmeric, etc., where cultivated, paddy was the main item of cultivation in olden time. But now rubber, areca nut, tapioca and coconut, etc., occupy the place of paddy field.

In olden times excess agricultural resources were sold on Mondays and Thursdays in the market place held respectively at Unniyal and Alanallur important sources of in came of the people who lived in this area were agriculture. The seeds of paddy used in this area were Aryan, Kumbhalam, Thekkencheera, Chitteni, and Ennapatta. In the availability of water agriculture fields were divided into four: Plliyal, Irippooval, Punchappadom and Karinkara. Just like that cultivation also divided. In the months of Kanni and Makaram. The paddy that cultivated was "Mundakan". "Viripp" was another form of cultivation in the month of Karkkidakam and Kanni. The crop in the month of Makaram was known as Puncha. Cultivation was started in the rainy season. It was depended upon rain. The small streams were used for watering the agricultural fields. They watered their agricultural lands with the materials made from palm-leaves and wood.

The farmers depend on the rivers Velliyar, Mundathodu and Puliyanthodu for irrigation. The farmers were made bunds in this water sources for different uses. Now these bunds were not existed. The waterfalls of "Vella Chatta Para" in Puliyanthodu is one of the outstanding features of the natural beauty of Edathanattukara. If the government will make arrangements, the waterfall is enough for power supply to this small village. It is an attractive place for the tourists in different parts. Major portion of cultivated lands were under landlords janmies. Zameendars divided the lands among "Mesthiries". The "Kudiyan" were controlled by mesthiries. The "Pattam system" compelled peasants to cultivate rice in 1930. Ana pattam and Ana pattam existed in this village. Moreover rice was the main pattam prevailed in these days. In the month of "Kanni" 60% pattam and in "Thulam" 40% pattam was levied upon the peasants. "Pattaparas" were known as "Madrapara". At that time the working time was from 6 am to 6 pm. The wages for men was 3 Narayam rice and for women was 2 Narayam rice. But nowadays working time of peasants is from 8 am to 5 pm.

In 1940 the beginning of NSS was a remarkable development in the field of agriculture. Nayar Service Society was started rubber plantation in 100 acre. Ravunni Paladan Janmi contributed this plot. It was also a turning point in the field of labour movement in this small village. Nowadays, rubber is the major agricultural item in Edathanattukara. Coconut got an important place in 1960. After the formation of "Aikya Kerala Movement" a large number of people settled in this village. The settlers were agriculturists and educationalists. They were settled in Ponlpara, Uppukulam and Kottappalla. Kottappalla Varkky was the first person who settled in Edathanattukara. But now many people were working under state and central government departments. A large number of graduates and postgraduates live in this village.

Education

There are many educational institutions in this small village. The oldest educational institution was Malabar Board School (GLPS Edathanattukara, Moochikkal). Chengara puthanveettil Unni Tharakan established first Hindu school with help of PT. It was established in 1911. Now it is working in the new building by Govt. DPEP Palakkad. AMLP School Vattamannapuram is the next. AMLP School Edathanattukara West (TAMUPS Edathanattukara) is the next educational institution. It is started in 1930 as a single room under the management of Ambhukkattu Ayamu Molla in Chirattakkulam. After that it was shifted to Pookkadanchery.

There is a centre in Edathanattukara for giving protection and education to orphans, established in 1949. The Social Welfare Department of Kerala provides assistance to this institution.

AUPS (PKHMOUPS) Edathanattukara was established in 1954 through the work of Parokkottil Kunhi Mammu Haji and Sons. Later, Hamza Haji gave this building and plot to the orphanage. Thus, under orphanage two UP schools are functioning now. 2000 students study in these two institutions. There are 300 inmates now in Edathanattukara orphanage. There is an institution in Edathanattukara that is educationally attractive, Govt Oriental Higher Secondary School. It is one of the three oriental schools in Kerala. In the remote area of Edathanattukara, There is an Upper Primary School at Chalava.

An important institution for English education in Edathanattukara is MES KTM English Medium Higher Secondary School at Vattamannapuram. Another one is Universal English Medium School at Kodiyamkunnu. These two institutions are very useful for the people of this small village. There are two institutions in Edathanattukara which giving importance for Arabic education. They are Miskathul Uloom Arabic College and Saraful Muslimeen Arabic College. It is useful for higher education in Arabic. There is a technical vocational  institution also situated in this village, Kappungal Saidalavi Haji Memorial ITC. A well-known advanced library is in Edathanattukara, CN Ahammed Moulavi Memorial Library and Centre for Advanced Studies, with thousands of books. Formation of this library is the work of CN Ahammed Moulavi. There is a Christian UP School at Uppukulam, named St. Thomas.

There are two schools in the remote area of Edathanattukara. They are GLP School at Chundottukunnu and ALP School at Mundakkunnu.

Culture
Edathanattukara has a pleasant cultural heritage where Hindus, Muslims and Christians live together. The best example for religious harmony is the "Karumanappan Kavu" Thalappoli. This festival had become a regional festival of all people in Edathanattukara. Many great personalities have contributed to the cultural development of Edathanattukara. Some of them are Muslim scholars, such as "Ishaq Master" who first translated the Bhagavad Gita to Malayalam. CN Ahamed Moulavi who first translated the Quran to Malayalam.

Edathanattukara is a centre of teaching religious harmony. The educated people taught others about Krishna and Muhammad by oral method. They also taught Manipravalam slogans and the Quran. At the time of the Malabar Rebellion in 1921, the people of this area kept aloof from rebellion. They were afraid and took their belongings to the hills of Uppukulam and took shelter there. Their wealth was kept in the head of palm trees and undergrounds.

The old art forms of Hindus like Thullal, Aattu, etc., are conducting now in the remote areas of Edathanattukara. In the words of KV Kunhappa Moulavi, historically important meeting of "Aikya Sanga" was held at Edathanattukara. It was about six decades ago. Many important personalities attend this historical meeting. But the speech of progressive movement in Edathanattukara was conducted by Parappoor Abdurahman Moulavi. Many people from different part were gathered to listen his speech. Until the 15th century Muslims were centralized only in Malappuram area. The arrival of the Portuguese and the destruction of their trade monopoly was the reason for Muslims to seek a new place for their livelihood. So the Muslim community became a major portion and started disturbing other communities  of remote area in this village. A Kalasamithi was formed in 1959–60 at Edathanattukara for giving leadership for arts and cultural activities. The building functions in the place of Appu tharakan. Under the Kalasamithi is a good library.

Health
Edathanattukara is not backward in the case of relief centers. The first among them is MES Hospital. It is established in 1960. many people depended upon this for many diseases. The ancient people of Edathanattukara used old systems of medicine. They depended upon Ayurvedic medicines only. The first "Nattu Vydiyan" in Edathanattukara were Vellan Kunjan (Velliyanchery), Poolamanna Ahammed Molla (Chirattakulam), Mannan Kurinjan (Chalava), Moideen Kutty Kaka (Kottappalla), Kittu Vydian (Alanallur) and Mohammed Molla (Alanallur), who were contributed much in the field of medicine at that time.

Politics
Edathanattukara is a part of Alanallur Panchayat and Mannarkkad legislative assembly constituency, it's a part of Palakkad parliament constituency. There are 23 gramapanchayath wards here. Indian National Congress, Muslim League, and CPI(M) are the main political parties here.

Transportion
Direct buses are available to Kozhikode, Palakkad, Perinthalmanna, Manjeri, Mannarkkad.
Nearest railway station is Melattur, 13 km from Edathanattukara.
Nearest airport is Calicut International Airport, 61 km from Edathanattukara.

Landmarks

 Sharaful Muslimeen Arabic Collage thadiyamparambu
 Masjidul Mujahideen, Pookkadancheri
 Edathanattukara Yatheem Khana (orphanage)
 TAMUPS Edathanattukara
 PKHMOUPSEdathanattukara-nalukandam
 Masjidhul Hudha, Chirattakkulam
 palakkadavu bridge
 kalamadam juma masjid
 Poovathingal Bhagavathi temple
 Darul Quraan Kottappalla
 Salafi centre Kottapalla
 Chathankurshi Sreerama-Narasimha moorthi Temple
 Salafi Musjid Mundakkunnu
 Darussalam juma masjid
 Sree Karumanappan Kavu Temple
 Edathanattukara pain and palliative care office
 Wisdom Educational complex Daarul Quraan, Kottappalla
 Pathiramanna shiva temple

Villages and suburbs 
 Kottappalla
 Yatheemkhana
 Mosco
 Pookkadancheri
 Kannankundu and Palakkazhy
 Mulappetta and Kara Millumpadi
 Unniyal and Palakkadavu Bridge
 Thadiyamparambu and Moscowcorner
 Chirakkakkulam and Kargil
 Nalukandam and Erangottu Kunnu
 Kodiyan Kunnu and Moochikkal
 Vattamannapuram
 Chalava
 Moonadi
 Ponpara
 Mundakkunnu
 Pilachola
 palakkadavu
 thadiyamparambu

References 

Villages in Palakkad district